Alejandra Vallejo (born 21 October 1958) is a Mexican former professional tennis player.

Between 1976 and 1987, Vallejo represented Mexico in 16 Federation Cup ties. She was winless in her eight singles rubbers, but fared better in doubles, finishing with a 6/7 record.

Vallejo regularly competed at the Pan American Games and won four medals for Mexico, all in doubles.

Since retiring she has remained involved in Mexican tennis, serving in roles such as President of the local tennis association and as Fed Cup captain.

ITF finals

Singles: 1 (0–1)

References

External links
 
 
 

1958 births
Living people
Mexican female tennis players
Pan American Games medalists in tennis
Pan American Games silver medalists for Mexico
Pan American Games bronze medalists for Mexico
Central American and Caribbean Games medalists in tennis
Central American and Caribbean Games gold medalists for Mexico
Central American and Caribbean Games silver medalists for Mexico
Tennis players at the 1975 Pan American Games
Tennis players at the 1979 Pan American Games
Tennis players at the 1983 Pan American Games
Medalists at the 1975 Pan American Games
Medalists at the 1979 Pan American Games
Medalists at the 1983 Pan American Games
20th-century Mexican women